In the Dutch research system, the Digital Author Identifier (DAI) system assigns a unique number to all academic authors as a form of authority control. The DAI links the PICA database in institutional libraries with the METIS national research information system.

The Digital Author Identifier is a unique national number for every author active within a Dutch university, university of applied sciences, or research institute. The DAI is prepared from the ISO standard “ISNI” (International Standard Name Identifier). The DAI brings several publications from an author together, and distinguishes between authors with the same name.

Other author identifiers 

The DAI is part of the national knowledge infrastructure. In the scientific community, other identifiers are in use as well, such as ORCID, ResearcherID, and ScopusId.

SURFfoundation has, in cooperation with OCLC PICA, created a connection with PICA National Thesaurus Authornames (NTA) that is supplied and maintained by university libraries. Important to this is the connection between the research information system Metis and the repositories.

Applications 

There are many potential applications for the DAI. Publications by an author can be collected more easily, even though the author may have worked at several institutions. When an author changes name, for example because of marriage, the DAI remains the same, enabling anyone to find publications from before the change of name. With a tool, publication lists can be generated on the basis of the DAI. These publications are collected from several repositories in Dutch scientific institutions. With the DAI, this information can be integrated into one list.

See also 
 VIAF

References

External links 
 Martin Enserink in Science, 27 march 2009, vol. 323, p.1662–1664 (not Open Access available).
 Author identification

Data modeling
Identifiers